is a Japanese politician. He entered politics in 1991, and served as a member of the City Council for Shizuoka from 1995 to 2003. He is serving his second term as mayor of Shizuoka City.

References

1961 births
Living people
Japanese politicians
People from Shizuoka (city)
Mayors of places in Shizuoka Prefecture
Shizuoka (city)